Radio 4 News FM was the national BBC station devoted to rolling news service that was on air during the Gulf War from 16 January until 2 March 1991. It was broadcast on Radio 4's FM frequencies, whilst regular scheduled service continued on longwave. This station was also broadcast on BBC World Service. At the time, some journalists gave it the nickname Scud FM from the Scud missiles used by Iraqi forces in the war.

The long-term impact of Radio 4 News FM was that the popularity of the station was taken as evidence that a rolling news service was required at the BBC. In response, Radio 5 Live was launched on 28 March 1994.

History

Operation
When Coalition forces began military operations against Iraq following the invasion of Kuwait on 2 August 1990, the BBC discontinued to broadcast usual mixed schedule on Radio 4's FM frequencies and replaced it with a rolling news service known by the emergency staff as Scud FM, named after "Saddam Hussein's most notorious weapon" was the Russian-made missile in which Iraq was firing at the Israeli city of Tel Aviv.

BBC staff had managed to launch a 17 hours a day rolling news channel (without time to concoct an official name) with less than 24 hours' notice and provided the listener with "access to the raw material, the events as they unfolded, from the daily military press conferences, the Presidential briefings to what it was like living in Baghdad, in Tel Aviv, with the troops in Saudi Arabia". The service was run by Jenny Abramsky and produced by volunteers, working on their days off: Brian Redhead, John Humphrys, Nick Clarke, Robin Lustig, Nicholas Witchell, Bob Simpson and Nick Ross.

Journalist Georgina Henry wrote at the time:

However, many BBC radio executives and listeners were unhappy about the loss of the FM stereo service, so when the conflict ended on 2 March 1991 as the rolling news service stopped. A later Henry article reported:

Despite this, both 29% of all stations and 68% of Radio 4 listeners heard it with an extra 1.5 million people tuning in to Radio 4 on longwave and FM frequencies.

Structure
Listeners wrote in "saying the new service was a lifeline", within the success of Radio 4 News FM convinced the BBC that a national radio rolling news network was required. However, Radio 4 listeners marched on Broadcasting House to preserve their FM and AM frequencies when it was suggested that the new service might launch on Radio 4's longwave frequency.

In The Daily Telegraph, Gillian Reynolds suggested:

The corporation replaced the "improvised and disjointed" station Radio 5, which had been launched on 27 August 1990, with Radio 5 Live as "a coherent and cohesive... service of intelligent news and sport for a younger audience". The new station launched on 28 March 1994.

Sources

References

Further reading
 
 
 

BBC Radio 4
BBC News channels
Defunct BBC national radio stations
Defunct radio stations in the United Kingdom
1991 establishments in the United Kingdom
1991 disestablishments in the United Kingdom
Radio stations established in 1991
Radio stations disestablished in 1991
1991 in radio
1991 in the United Kingdom
1990s in the United Kingdom
News and talk radio stations in the United Kingdom
Military broadcasting
Gulf War